Novena is the fourth album by rock band Slapshock, released in 2004.

It was certified gold in the Philippines.

Track listing 
All songs written by Jamir Garcia, Music By Slapshock

Personnel 
 Vladimir Garcia – vocals
 Lee Nadela - bass
 Leandro Ansing - guitar
 Jerry Basco - guitar
 Richard Evora – drums

Additional Musician:
 Jun-Rey Parajes - violin, guest appearance
 Tooting Demeterio - vocals, guest appearance
 Papa Sok Alfafara - percussion, guest appearance

Album Credits 
 Francis Reyes – producer
 Angee Rozul – engineer

Accolades

References 

Slapshock albums
2002 albums